The European School of Alicante is one of thirteen European Schools and the only one in Spain. Founded in 2002, it primarily serves to provide an education to the children of staff posted to the European Union Intellectual Property Office, an EU agency based in the city of Alicante.

See also 
European School
European Schools

References

External links
 Official website of the European School, Alicante

Alicante
International schools in Spain
Educational institutions established in 2002
2002 establishments in Spain